Hypodrassodes is a genus of South Pacific ground spiders that was first described by R. de Dalmas in 1919.

Species
 it contains eleven species:
Hypodrassodes apicus Forster, 1979 – New Zealand
Hypodrassodes asbolodes (Rainbow & Pulleine, 1920) – Australia (Lord Howe Is.)
Hypodrassodes canacus Berland, 1924 – New Caledonia
Hypodrassodes cockerelli Berland, 1932 – New Caledonia
Hypodrassodes courti Forster, 1979 – New Zealand
Hypodrassodes crassus Forster, 1979 – New Zealand
Hypodrassodes dalmasi Forster, 1979 – New Zealand
Hypodrassodes ignambensis Berland, 1924 – New Caledonia
Hypodrassodes insulanus Forster, 1979 – New Zealand
Hypodrassodes isopus Forster, 1979 – New Zealand
Hypodrassodes maoricus (Dalmas, 1917) (type) – New Zealand

References

Araneomorphae genera
Gnaphosidae
Spiders of Australia
Spiders of New Zealand